The European Journal of Taxonomy is a peer-reviewed open access scientific journal for descriptive taxonomy of living and fossil eukaryotes, covering subjects in zoology, botany, and palaeontology. It is supported by the EJT Consortium, a group of European natural history institutes, which fully funds the publication. Therefore, the journal is free for both authors and readers (diamond open access).

History
The journal was initiated by a task force of people from the European Distributed Institute of Taxonomy network. The first article was published on 9 September 2011. In October 2015, the Consortium of European Taxonomic Facilities endorsed the journal.

Several older journals have been merged into the European Journal of Taxonomy:
Journal of Afrotropical Zoology
Bulletin de l'Institut Royal des Sciences Naturelles de Belgique, Entomologie
Bulletin de l'Institut Royal des Sciences Naturelles de Belgique, Biologie
Bulletin de l'Institut Royal des Sciences Naturelles de Belgique, Sciences de la Terre
Steenstrupia
Zoologische Mededelingen

Abstracting and indexing
The journal is abstracted and indexed in:
Biological Abstracts
BIOSIS Previews
CAB Abstracts
Current Contents/Agriculture, Biology & Environmental Sciences
Science Citation Index Expanded
The Zoological Record
According to the Journal Citation Reports, the journal has a 2020 impact factor of 1.372.

References

External links

English-language journals
Continuous journals
Publications established in 2011
Systematics journals